Kerry Shale (born 4 June 1952) is a Canadian actor and writer based in London, England. His Radio 4 comedy-drama The Kubrick Test was broadcast in 2020.

Filmography

Film

Television

Video games

References

External links

Living people
20th-century British male actors
20th-century Canadian male actors
21st-century British male actors
21st-century Canadian male actors
Audiobook narrators
British male film actors
British male stage actors
British male television actors
British male video game actors
British male voice actors
Canadian emigrants to England
Canadian male film actors
Canadian male stage actors
Canadian male television actors
Canadian male video game actors
Canadian male voice actors
Male actors from London
Year of birth missing (living people)
Canadian expatriates in England